Clifton Park Hotel is a historic hotel located at Clifton Park and Halfmoon in Saratoga County, New York.  It was first erected in the 1820s and is a 2-story, timber-framed building sheathed in clapboards and topped by a gable roof.  A massive, 2-story wood portico / piazza was added in the 1840s, along with a -story, two-bay, frame addition.  The building was renovated in the 1880s and once featured a dance hall.  The building exhibits a number of Greek Revival design features.  It remained in commercial use into the 1970s.

It was listed on the National Register of Historic Places in 1998.

As of 2013 the building has been stabilized and re-roofed, but remains vacant.

References

Hotel buildings on the National Register of Historic Places in New York (state)
Greek Revival architecture in New York (state)
Buildings and structures in Saratoga County, New York
National Register of Historic Places in Saratoga County, New York